Jens Hacke (born 6 December 1973) is a German political scientist and author.

Life 
Born in Bonn, Hacke was born in 1973 as the son of the political scientist  in Bonn. He studied ancient, modern and contemporary history as well as political science and philosophy Die deutsche Rechte und die Revolution. Ein Beitrag zur Ideengeschichte des Nationalsozialismus und der "Konservativen Revolution". Subsequently, Hacke was a research assistant in the "Theorie der Politik" department of the "Politikwissenschaft Online" project funded by the Bundesministerium für Bildung und Forschung until 2003 and a research assistant at the Institute for Social Sciences at the Humboldt University until 2008. In 2005, Hacke was awarded a doctorate in political science under the direction of Herfried Münkler. In 2007, he took on a teaching position at the Institute for Political Science of the University of Hamburg. From 2008 to 2016, he was a research assistant at the Hamburg Institute for Social Research. From 2016 to 2018, he held a chair for political science at the Martin Luther University of Halle-Wittenberg; in 2018/19, he taught as a professorial assistant at the University of Greifswald.

Since August 2020, Hacke has been teaching at the Bundeswehr University Munich.

Audios 
 Die symbolpolitische Flanke ist offen., Jens Hacke über die Reichsflagge, Gespräch mit Mascha Drost, Deutschlandfunk Kultur heute, 30 August 2020, 6.27 Minuten, Textversion: "Symbolpolitische Flanke ist offen"

Publications 
 Author
 Philosophie der Bürgerlichkeit. Vandenhoeck & Ruprecht, Göttingen 2006 (zugleich: Humboldt-Universität, Diss., 2005), .
 Die Bundesrepublik als Idee. Zur Legitimationsbedürftigkeit politischer Ordnung. Hamburger Edition, Hamburg 2009, .
 Existenzkrise der Demokratie. Zur politischen Theorie des Liberalismus in der Zwischenkriegszeit. Suhrkamp, Berlin 2018 (zugleich: Humboldt-Universität, Habilitationsschrift, 2017), .

 Publisher
 with : Streit um den Staat. Intellektuelle Debatten in der Bundesrepublik 1960–1980. Vandenhoeck & Ruprecht, Göttingen 2008, .
 with : Theorie in der Geschichtswissenschaft. Einblicke in die Praxis des historischen Forschens. Campus, Frankfurt, 2008, .
 with Herfried Münkler: Strategien der Visualisierung. Verbildlichung als Mittel politischer Kommunikation. Campus, Frankfurt, 2009, .
 with Herfried Münkler: Wege in die neue Bundesrepublik. Politische Mythen und kollektive Selbstbilder nach 1989. Campus, Frankfurt , 2009, .
 Moritz Julius Bonn – Zur Krise der Demokratie. Politische Schriften in der Weimarer Republik 1919–1932. Walter de Gruyter, Berlin/Boston 2015, .
 with Ewald Grothe: Liberales Denken in der Krise der Weltkriegsepoche. Moritz Julius Bonn. Steiner, Stuttgart 2018, .

References

External links 
 
 

German political scientists
German male writers
1973 births
Living people
Writers from Bonn